The Innes Book of Records is the third solo album by Neil Innes and was released in 1979 to accompany the BBC television series of the same name.  The audio recordings on the album are not the same as those used as the audio track for the television series, some of the arrangements being markedly different.

Each episode in the series was an anthology of short music videos featuring Innes and other performers.  At the beginning of each episode is a short introductory video; one showed a man in a spacesuit exploring a deserted house, finding a record player covered in cobwebs, sitting down and listening to a record, so beginning the first song and its accompanying video.

Reviewer Richie Unterberger, of Allmusic, described it as "imbued with the characteristic droll, wry wit and knack for pastiche of all manners of pop music that typify Innes' work", and noted that it veered "more to Ray Davies territory than comedy rock, though Innes isn't at all imitative of the Kinks.".

Track listing
All tracks written by Neil Innes.

Side one
 "Here We Go Again" - 3:20
 "Montana Cafe" - 3:31
 "All In the Name of Love" - 3:43
 "Kenny and Liza" - 3:48
 "Amoeba Boogie" - 4:27

Side two
 "Theme" (instrumental) - 2:51
 "Human Race" - 4:30
 "Spontaneous" - 3:41
 "Love Is Getting Deeper" - 3:34
 "Etcetera" - 3:49

Musicians
Drums: Stuart Elliot, Peter Van Hooke
Bass: Bruce Lynch, Harvey Weston
Keyboards: Billy Livsey
Guitars: Brian Holloway, Richard Brunton, Mitch Dalton
Piano: Brian Lemon
Vocals: Sharon Campbell, Yvonne Keeley, Anne Kavanagh, Paul Travis, Kenny Dukayne, Gary Travers
Trumpets: Henry Lowther, Digby Fairweather, Martin Drover, Dave Spence
Trombones: John Mumford, Paul Nieman, Pete Strange
Saxophone: Bill Skeat, Randy Colville, Tommy Whittle, Keith Gemmell, Pat Kyle
Strings: Leader: Richard Studt (special thanks to Nigel Warren-Green)
Arrangements: John Altman

References

External links 
Neil Innes solo issues
New "Book of Records" website

1979 albums
Polydor Records albums
Neil Innes albums
Albums produced by Neil Innes